Shunki (written: 峻希 or 俊希) is a masculine Japanese given name. Notable people with the name include:

, Japanese footballer
, Japanese footballer

Japanese masculine given names